Lamentaciones de Jeremías Propheta (or Hieremiae Prophetae Lamentationes) is a choral work composed by Alberto Ginastera in 1946.

It is based on texts freely selected from the Lamentations of Jeremiah the Prophet. The work is divided into three parts: O vos omnes, Ego vir videns and Recordare, Domine.

1946 compositions
Choral compositions
Compositions by Alberto Ginastera